Thaddeus Lewis Biernat (October 27, 1918 – August 1, 1996) was an American businessman and politician.

Biernat was born in Minneapolis, Minnesota. He graduated from Edison High School in Minneapolis in 1936. Biernat served in the United States Army during World War II. He went to University of Minnesota. Biernat owned Biernat's Liquor and Groceries store. Biernat served in the Minnesota House of Representatives from 1949 to 1956 and was a Democrat. He died at his home in Minneapolis. His son Len Biernat also served in the Minnesota Legislature.

Notes

1918 births
1996 deaths
Businesspeople from Minneapolis
Military personnel from Minneapolis
Politicians from Minneapolis
University of Minnesota alumni
Democratic Party members of the Minnesota House of Representatives
20th-century American politicians
20th-century American businesspeople
Edison High School (Minnesota) alumni
United States Army personnel of World War II